Holy Cross High School is a private, Roman Catholic high school in Covington, Kentucky. It is located in the Roman Catholic Diocese of Covington. The mascot is a representation of a Native American. The current principal is Mr. Mike Holtz

Background
Holy Cross High School was established in 1891. It has two buildings: the first, the "Old Building", was built in 1891, while the other, the "New Building", was built in 1961. The school is known for its academic enhancement program which features courses focused on assisting students who have difficulty in core subjects. The school also offers a variety of programs to assist families requiring financial assistance.

Extracurricular activities
Holy Cross High School offers a wide range of activities for students. It is perhaps best known for its Y-Club, which facilitates participation in the Kentucky Youth Assembly and Kentucky United Nations Assembly, the two statewide mock government conferences facilitated by the Kentucky YMCA. Since its founding in 2012, the Holy Cross Y-Club has produced a Chief Justice (KYA), a President of the Senate (KYA), and 2 Secretary-Generals (KUNA). Approximately 1/3 of the school attends each conference. Teams of 15 students are chosen to attend one international mock government conference per year, typically hosted by a premiere university. Students are selected based on achievement in the statewide conferences, and past competitions have included the Harvard Model United Nations and Harvard Model Congress San Francisco.

Other popular activities include art club, football, soccer, basketball, volleyball, golf, bowling, softball, track and field, cross country, swimming, intramural basketball, tennis, academic team, school paper, drama club, choir, Students Against Destructive Decisions (SADD), rosary club, and baseball. Among the major sports, soccer, basketball and volleyball have won the Kentucky "All-A Tournament" in recent years. The school has won two state sanctioned State Championships by the football team in 2011, and in 2015 the girls' basketball team won State and the All "A" Classic ending the year #25 in the US.

References

External links
 

Catholic secondary schools in Kentucky
Educational institutions established in 1891
Schools in Kenton County, Kentucky
1891 establishments in Kentucky
Buildings and structures in Covington, Kentucky